William-Adolphe Bouguereau (30 November 1825 – 19 August 1905) was a French academic painter. In his realistic genre paintings, he used mythological themes, making modern interpretations of classical subjects, with an emphasis on the female human body. During his life, he enjoyed significant popularity in France and the United States, was given numerous official honors, and received top prices for his work. As the quintessential salon painter of his generation, he was reviled by the Impressionist avant-garde. By the early twentieth century, Bouguereau and his art fell out of favor with the public, due in part to changing tastes. In the 1980s, a revival of interest in figure painting led to a rediscovery of Bouguereau and his work. He finished 822 known paintings, but the whereabouts of many are still unknown.

Life and career

Formative years
William-Adolphe Bouguereau was born in La Rochelle, France, on 30 November 1825, into a family of wine and olive oil merchants. The son of Théodore Bouguereau (born 1800) and Marie Bonnin (1804), known as Adeline, William was brought up a Catholic. He had an elder brother, Alfred, and a younger sister, Marie (known as Hanna), who died when she was seven. The family moved to Saint-Martin-de-Ré in 1832. Another sibling was born in 1834, Kitty. At the age of twelve, Bouguereau went to Mortagne-sur-Gironde to stay with his uncle Eugène, a priest, and developed a love of nature, religion and literature. In 1839, he was sent to study for the priesthood at a Catholic college in Pons. Here he was taught to draw and paint by Louis Sage, who had studied under Ingres. Bouguereau reluctantly left his studies to return to his family, now residing in Bordeaux. There he met a local artist, Charles Marionneau, and commenced at the Municipal School of Drawing and Painting in November 1841. Bouguereau also worked as a shop assistant, hand-colouring lithographs and making small paintings that were reproduced using chromolithography. He was soon the best pupil in his class, and decided to become an artist in Paris. To fund the move, he sold portraits – 33 oils in three months. All were unsigned and only one has been traced. In 1845, he returned to Mortagne to spend more time with his uncle. He arrived in Paris in March 1846, aged twenty.

Bouguereau became a student at the École des Beaux-Arts. To supplement his formal training in drawing, he attended anatomical dissections and studied historical costumes and archeology. He was admitted to the studio of François-Édouard Picot, where he studied painting in the academic style. Dante and Virgil in Hell (1850) was an early example of his neo-classical works. Academic painting placed the highest status on historical and mythological subjects, and Bouguereau determined to win the Prix de Rome, which would gain him a three-year residence at the Villa Medici in Rome, Italy, where in addition to formal lessons he could study at first hand the Renaissance artists and their masterpieces, as well as Greek, Etruscan, and Roman antiquities.

Villa Medici, Rome 1851–1854
The young artist entered the Prix de Rome contest in April 1848. Soon after work began there were riots in Paris, and Bouguereau enrolled in the National Guard. After an unsuccessful attempt to win the prize, he entered again in 1849. Following 106 days of competition, he again failed to win. His third attempt commenced unsuccessfully in April 1850 with Dante and Virgil but five months later, he heard he had won a joint first prize for Shepherds Find Zenobia on the Banks of the Araxes. 

Along with other category winners, he set off for Rome in December and finally arrived at the Villa Medici in January 1851. Bouguereau explored the city, making sketches and watercolours as he went. He also studied classical literature, which influenced his subject choice for the rest of his career. He walked to Naples and on to Capri, Amalfi and Pompeii. Still based in Rome and working hard on course work, there were more explorations of Italy in 1852. Although he had a strong admiration for all traditional art, he particularly revered Greek sculpture, Leonardo da Vinci, Raphael, Michelangelo, Titian, Rubens and Delacroix. In April 1854, he left Rome and returned to La Rochelle.

Height of career

Bouguereau, painting within the traditional academic style, exhibited at the annual exhibitions of the Paris Salon for his entire working life. An early reviewer stated, "M. Bouguereau has a natural instinct and knowledge of contour. The eurythmie of the human body preoccupies him, and in recalling the happy results which, in this genre, the ancients and the artists of the sixteenth century arrived at, one can only congratulate M. Bouguereau in attempting to follow in their footsteps ... Raphael was inspired by the ancients ... and no one accused him of not being original."

Raphael was a favourite of Bouguereau and he took this review as a high compliment. He had fulfilled one of the requirements of the Prix de Rome by completing an old-master copy of Raphael's The Triumph of Galatea. In many of his works, he followed the same classical approach to composition, form, and subject matter. Bouguereau's graceful portraits of women were considered very charming, partly because he could beautify a sitter while also retaining her likeness.

Although Bouguereau spent most of his life in Paris, he returned to La Rochelle again and again throughout his professional life. He was revered in the town of his birth and undertook decorating commissions from local citizens. From the early 1870s, he and his family spent every summer in La Rochelle. In 1882, he decided that rather than rent he would purchase a house, as well as local farm buildings. By August of that year, the family's permanent summer base was on the rue Verdière. The artist commenced several paintings here and completed them in his Paris studio.

Bouguereau flourished after his Villa Medici residence. In 1854–55 he decorated a pavilion at the grand house of a cousin in Angoulins, including four large paintings of figures depicting the seasons. He was happy to undertake other commissions to pay off the debts accrued in Italy and to help his penniless mother. He decorated a mansion with nine large paintings of allegorical figures. In 1856, the Ministry of State for Fine Arts commissioned him to paint Emperor Napoleon III Visiting the Victims of the Tarascon Flood. There were decorations for the chapel at Saint-Clotilde. He received the Legion of Honour on 12 July 1859. By this time, Bouguereau was turning away from history painting and lengthy commissions to work on more personal paintings, with realistic and rustic themes.

By the late 1850s, he had made strong connections with art dealers, particularly Paul Durand-Ruel (later the champion of the Impressionists), who helped clients buy paintings from artists who exhibited at the Salons. Thanks to Durand-Ruel, Bouguereau met Hugues Merle, who later often was compared to Bouguereau. The Salons annually drew over 300,000 people, providing valuable exposure to exhibited artists. Bouguereau's fame extended to England by the 1860s. Three paintings were shown at the 1863 Salon and Holy Family (Now at Chimei Museum) was sold to Napoleon III, who presented it to his wife the Empress Eugénie, who hung it in her Tuileries apartment.

Bather (1864), a shocking nude, was submitted to an exhibition in Ghent, Belgium. It was a spectacular success and purchased by the museum at great expense. At this time, William took on decorative work at the Grand Théâtre, Bordeaux, which lasted four years. In 1875, with assistants, he began work on a La Rochelle chapel ceiling, producing six paintings on copper over the next six years. Once installed in the city in summer 1875 he began Pietà, one of his greatest religious paintings and shown at the 1876 Salon, in tribute to his son Georges. At the behest of King William III of the Netherlands, Bouguereau went to Het Loo Palace in May 1876. The king admired the artist and they spent intimate times together. In May 1878 the Paris Universal Exhibition opened to showcase French work. Bouguereau found and borrowed twelve of his paintings from their owners, including his new work Nymphaeum.

Bouguereau was a staunch traditionalist whose genre paintings and mythological themes were modern interpretations of Classical subjects, both pagan and Christian, with a concentration on the naked female form. The idealized world of his paintings brought to life goddesses, nymphs, bathers, shepherdesses, and madonnas in a way that appealed to wealthy art patrons of the era.

Bouguereau employed traditional methods of working up a painting, including detailed pencil studies and oil sketches, and his careful method resulted in a pleasing and accurate rendering of the human form. His painting of skin, hands, and feet was particularly admired. He also used some of the religious and erotic symbolism of the Old Masters, such as the "broken pitcher" which connoted lost innocence.

Bouguereau received many commissions to decorate private houses and public buildings, and, early on, this added to his prestige and fame. As was typical of such commissions, he would sometimes paint in his own style, and at other times conform to an existing group style. He also made reductions of his public paintings for sale to patrons, of which The Annunciation (1888) is an example. He was also a successful portrait painter and many of his paintings of wealthy patrons remain in private hands.

Académie Julian
From the 1860s, Bouguereau was closely associated with the Académie Julian where he gave lessons and advice to art students, male and female, from around the world. During several decades he taught drawing and painting to hundreds, if not thousands, of students. Many of them managed to establish artistic careers in their own countries, sometimes following his academic style, and in other cases, rebelling against it, like Henri Matisse. He married his most famous pupil, Elizabeth Jane Gardner, after the death of his first wife.

Bouguereau received many honors from the Academy: he became a Life Member in 1876; received the Grand Medal of Honour in 1885; was appointed Commander of the Legion of Honor in 1885; and was made Grand Officier of the Legion of Honour in 1905. He began to teach drawing at the Académie Julian in 1875, a co-ed art institution independent of the École des Beaux-Arts, with no entrance exams and nominal fees.

Wives and children

In 1856, William began living with one of his models, Nelly Monchablon, a 19-year-old from Lisle-en-Rigault. Living together unmarried, the pair kept their liaison a secret. Their first child, Henriette, was born in April 1857; Georges was born in January 1859. A third child, Jeanne, was born 25 December 1861. The couple married quietly (as many assumed they were already married) on 24 May 1866. Eight days later, Jeanne died from tuberculosis. In mourning, the couple went to La Rochelle, and Bouguereau made a painting of her in 1868. A fourth child, Adolphe (known as Paul), was born in October 1868. Aged 15, Georges' health suffered, and his mother took him away from the bad air of Paris. However, he died on 19 June 1875. Nelly had a fifth child in 1876, Maurice, but her health was declining and the doctors suspected that she had contracted tuberculosis. She died on 3 April 1877, and baby Maurice died two months later.

The artist planned to marry Elizabeth Jane Gardner, a pupil whom he had known for ten years, but his mother was opposed to the idea. Soon after Nelly's death, she made Bouguereau swear he would not remarry within her lifetime. After his mother's death, and after a nineteen-year engagement, he and Gardner married in Paris in June 1896. His wife continued to work as his private secretary, and helped to organize the household staff. His son Paul contracted tuberculosis in early 1899; Paul, his stepmother, and Bouguereau went to Menton in the south. When the stay was prolonged, the artist found a room in which to paint. Paul died at his father's house in April 1900, aged 32; Bouguereau had outlived four of his five children, only Henriette outlived him. Elizabeth, who was with her husband to the end, died in Paris in January 1922.

Homes
When Bouguereau arrived in Paris in March 1846, he resided at the Hotel Corneille at 5 rue Corneille. In 1855, after his stay in Rome, he lived at 27 rue de Fleurus, and the following year rented a fourth-floor studio at 3 rue Carnot, near his apartment. In 1866, the year of his marriage to Nelly, he bought a vast plot of land on the rue Notre-Dame-des-Champs, and an architect was commissioned to design a grand house with a top-floor studio. The family was installed in 1868, together with five servants and with his mother, Adeline, visiting daily. Bouguereau spent the rest of his life here and at La Rochelle.

Later years and death
Bouguereau was an assiduous painter, often completing twenty or more easel paintings in a single year. Even during the twilight years of his life, he would rise at dawn to work on his paintings six days a week and would continue painting until nightfall. Throughout the course of his lifetime, he is known to have painted at least 822 paintings. Many of these paintings have been lost. Near the end of his life he described his love of his art: "Each day I go to my studio full of joy; in the evening when obliged to stop because of darkness I can scarcely wait for the next morning to come ... if I cannot give myself to my dear painting I am miserable."

In the spring of 1905, Bouguereau's house and studio in Paris were burgled. On 19 August 1905, aged 79, Bouguereau died in La Rochelle from heart disease. There was an outpouring of grief in the town of his birth. After a Mass at the cathedral, his body was placed on a train to Paris for a second ceremony. Bouguereau was laid to rest with Nelly and his children at the family vault at Montparnasse Cemetery.

Notable works

Reputation

In his own time, Bouguereau was considered to be one of the greatest painters in the world by the academic art community, and simultaneously he was reviled by the avant-garde. He also gained wide fame in Belgium, the Netherlands, Portugal, Spain, Italy, Romania and in the United States, and commanded high prices. His works often sold within days of completion. Some were viewed by international collectors and bought before work had even finished.

Bouguereau's career was nearly a direct ascent with hardly a setback. To many, he epitomized taste and refinement, and a respect for tradition. To others, he was a competent technician stuck in the past. Degas and his associates used the term "Bouguereauté" in a derogatory manner to describe any artistic style reliant on "slick and artificial surfaces", also known as a licked finish. In an 1872 letter, Degas wrote that he strove to emulate Bouguereau's ordered and productive working style, although with Degas' famous trenchant wit, and the aesthetic tendencies of the Impressionists, it is possible the statement was meant to be ironic. Paul Gauguin loathed him, rating him a round zero in Racontars de Rapin and later describing in Avant et après (Intimate Journals) the single occasion when Bouguereau made him smile on coming across a couple of his paintings in an Arles brothel, "where they belonged".

Bouguereau's works were eagerly bought by American millionaires who considered him the most important French artist of that time. For example, Nymphs and Satyr was purchased first by John Wolfe, then sold by his heiress Catharine Lorillard Wolfe to hotelier Edward Stokes, who displayed it in New York City's Hoffman House Hotel. Two paintings by Bouguereau in the Nob Hill mansion of Leland Stanford were destroyed in the San Francisco earthquake and fire of 1906. Gold Rush tycoon James Ben Ali Haggin and his family, who normally eschewed the nude, made an exception for Bouguereau's Nymphaeum.

However, even during his lifetime, there was critical dissent in assessing his work; the art historian Richard Muther wrote in 1894 that Bouguereau was a man "destitute of artistic feeling but possessing a cultured taste [who] reveals... in his feeble mawkishness, the fatal decline of the old schools of convention." In 1926, American art historian Frank Jewett Mather criticized the commercial intent of Bouguereau's work, writing that the artist "multiplied vague, pink effigies of nymphs, occasionally draped them, when they became saints and madonnas, painted on the great scale that dominates an exhibition, and has had his reward. I am convinced that the nude of Bouguereau was prearranged to meet the ideals of a New York stockbroker of the black walnut generation." Bouguereau confessed in 1891 that the direction of his mature work was largely a response to the marketplace: "What do you expect, you have to follow public taste, and the public only buys what it likes. That's why, with time, I changed my way of painting."

Bouguereau fell into disrepute after 1920, due in part to changing tastes. Comparing his work to that of his Realist and Impressionist contemporaries, Kenneth Clark faulted Bouguereau's painting for "lubricity", and characterized such Salon art as superficial, employing the "convention of smoothed-out form and waxen surface."

The New York Cultural Center staged a show of Bouguereau's work in 1974—partly as a curiosity, although curator Robert Isaacson had his eye on the long-term rehabilitation of Bouguereau's legacy and reputation. In 1984, the Borghi Gallery hosted a commercial show of 23 oil paintings and one drawing. In the same year a major exhibition was organized by the Montreal Museum of Fine Arts in Canada. The exhibition opened at the Musée du Petit-Palais, in Paris, traveled to The Wadsworth Atheneum in Hartford, and concluded in Montréal. More recently, resurgence in the artist's popularity has been promoted by American collector Fred Ross, who owns a number of paintings by Bouguereau and features him on his website at Art Renewal Center.

In 2019, the Milwaukee Art Museum assembled more than 40 of Bouguereau's paintings for a major retrospective of his work, which according to The Wall Street Journal, asked the readers to "see Bouguereau through the eyes of an age when he was lionized, and Impressionism was dismissed as 'French freedom.' " The exhibition later was scheduled to travel to the Memphis Brooks Museum of Art in Memphis, Tenn., and then to the San Diego Museum of Art.

Prices for Bouguereau's works have climbed steadily since 1975, with major paintings selling at high prices: $1,500,000 in 1998 for The Heart's Awakening, $2,600,000 in 1999 for The Motherland and Charity at auction in May 2000 for $3,500,000. Bouguereau's works are in many public collections.

Notre Dame des Anges ("Our Lady of the Angels") was last shown publicly in the United States at the World's Columbian Exhibition in Chicago in 1893. It was donated in 2002 to the Daughters of Mary Mother of Our Savior, an order of nuns affiliated with Clarence Kelly's Traditionalist Catholic Society of St. Pius V. In 2009, the nuns sold it for $450,000 to an art dealer, who was able to sell it for more than $2 million. Kelly was subsequently found guilty by a jury in Albany, New York, of defaming the dealer in remarks made in a television interview.

Name

Awards and honours 
 1848: Second Prix de Rome, for Saint Pierre après sa délivrance de prison, vient retrouver les fidèles chez Marie.
 1850: Premier Prix de Rome, for Zenobie retrouvée par les bergers sur les bords de l'Araxe.
 1859: Knight of the Legion of Honour
 1876: Officer of the Legion of Honour
 1881: Knight in the Order of Leopold
 1885: Commander of the Legion of Honour
 1885: Grand Medal of Honour
 1890: Member of the Royal Academy of Science, Letters and Fine Arts of Belgium
 1905: Grand Officier of the Legion of Honour

In literature
In The King in Yellow, by Robert W. Chambers, he is mentioned in various tales as a teacher at the École des Beaux-Arts.

In Sir Arthur Conan Doyle's novel The Sign of the Four (1890), the character Mr Sholto remarks, "there cannot be the least question about the Bouguereau. I am partial to the modern French school."

Selected works

 La Danse (1856)
 Bather (1864)
 Loin du Pays (painting and two reductions) Far From Home (1867)
 Alone in the World (Latest 1867)
 The Knitting Girl (1869)
 The Elder Sister (1869)
 Italian Girl at the Fountain (1870)
 Baigneuse (1870)
 Nymphs and Satyr (1873)
 Homer and his Guide (1874)
 At the Edge of the River (1875)
 Flora and Zephyr (1875)
 The Grape Picker (1875)
 The Little Knitter (1875)
 La Jeunesse et l'Amour (1877)
 The Donkey Ride (1878)
 The Birth of Venus (1879)
 Girl Defending herself against Cupid (1880)
 Song of the Angels (1881)
 Evening Mood (1882)
 The Nut Gatherers (1882)
 Alma Parens of Mother France (1883)
 The Youth of Bacchus (1884)
 Biblis (1884)
 The Return of Spring (1886)
 Woman with Captive Cupid (1886)
 The First Mourning (1888)
 The Shepherdess (1889)
 Les murmures de l'Amour (1889)
 Gabrielle Cot, a portrait of Cot's daughter, 1890
 L'Amour et Psyché, enfants (1890)
 The Bohemian (1890)
 Little Beggars (1890)
 Le Travail interrompu (1891)
 The Goose Girl (1891)
 The Wasps Nest (1892)
 Innocence (1893)
 Pleasant Burden (1895)
 The Ravishment of Psyche (1895)
 The Wave (1896)
 Admiration (1897)
 La Vierge au lys (1899)
 Rêve de printemps (1901)
 Yvonne on the Doorstep (1901)
 The Oreads (1902)
 Oceanid (1904)
 In The Woods (1905)
Source

Gallery

See also
 Gustave Doyen
 Sir Lawrence Alma-Tadema

References

Further reading

 
 
 Bouguereau, William-Adolphe (1885). Catalogue illustré des œuvres de W. Bouguereau, Paris: L. Baschet.

External links

 William-Adolphe Bouguereau: The Complete Works

1825 births
1905 deaths
People from La Rochelle
19th-century French painters
19th-century French male artists
20th-century French painters
20th-century French male artists
Academic staff of the Académie Julian
Prix de Rome for painting
French Realist painters
French Roman Catholics
Academic art
École des Beaux-Arts alumni
Burials at Montparnasse Cemetery
French male painters
Grand Officiers of the Légion d'honneur
Orientalist painters
Members of the Royal Academy of Belgium
Pont-Aven painters